Hon. Nicholas Herbert  (c.1706 – 1 February 1775) was a British politician who sat in the House of Commons between 1740 and 1774 and a member of the Herbert family. He became the Treasurer of Princess Amelia of Great Britain, of the Royal House of Hanover, in 1757.

Life
Herbert was born at Werrington, Devon, the 7th son of Thomas Herbert, 8th Earl of Pembroke of Wilton House, and his first wife Margaret Sawyer of Highclere Castle, daughter of Sir Robert Sawyer MP of Highclere, Hampshire. He was educated probably at Eton College in 1725 and matriculated at Christ Church, Oxford on 2 December 1726, aged 20. He married  Anne North, daughter of Dudley North and Katherine Yale, the daughter of Elihu Yale, on 19 July 1737.

Herbert was returned as Member of Parliament for Newport in a by-election on 22 January 1740 on the Morice interest. He was returned unopposed in  1741.  From 1742 to 1745 he was cashier and accountant to the Treasurer of the Navy. He was returned unopposed at Newport in 1747 and in a contest in 1754

In 1756 Herbert vacated his seat at Newport and was returned in a by-election on  17 April 1757 as MP for Wilton on  the interest of his nephew Henry Herbert, 10th Earl of Pembroke. He was appointed  Treasurer to Princess Amelia in 1757.  However he lost his place as treasurer when George III  came to the throne and was frustrated at not being offered any other post. He was returned unopposed at Wilton in 1761. In 1765 he was appointed Secretary of Jamaica, a post he held until his death. He was returned unopposed at Wilton in 1768 and  1774. He is not known to have spoken in Parliament or to have voted against any Administration.

Herbert died on 1 February 1775 and was buried at Little Glemham. His only surviving child Barbara married Edward Stratford, 2nd Earl of Aldborough.

References

1700s births
1775 deaths
Alumni of Christ Church, Oxford
British MPs 1741–1747
British MPs 1747–1754
British MPs 1754–1761
British MPs 1761–1768
British MPs 1768–1774
British MPs 1774–1780
Members of the Parliament of Great Britain for English constituencies
Younger sons of earls